Echinopsis peruviana (syn.

Description

The plant is bluish-green in color, with frosted stems, and 6-9 broadly rounded ribs; it has large, white flowers.

Taxonomy

Subspecies
Echinopsis peruviana ssp. puquiensis (Rauh & Backeb.) Ostolaza

Varieties
Some varieties, with scientifically invalid names, of Echinopsis peruviana are:
 var. ancash (KK1688), San Marcos, Ancash, northwest Peru.
 var. ayacuchensis (KK2151), southwestern Peru.
 var. cuzcoensis (KK340), Huachac, Cuzco, southeastern Peru.
 var. (H14192), Huntington, USA.
 var. huancabamba, Piura, northwest Peru.
 var. huancavelica (KK242a), west central Peru.
 var. huancayo (KK338), west central Peru.
 var. huaraz (KK2152), Ancash, northwestern Peru.

 var. matucana (KK242) Lima, central west Peru.
 var. puquiensis (KK1689), Puquio, Apurímac Region, southwestern Peru.
 var. Rio Lurin (KK2147), Rio Rimac, Lima, west central Peru.
 var. tarmensis (KK2148), Tarma, Junín, west central Peru.
 var. trujilloensis, Trujillo, La Libertad, northwestern Peru.

Mescaline content
Echinopsis peruviana is one of a number of Echinopsis species native to the Andes that have been reported to contain the psychoactive alkaloid mescaline. Others include E. pachanoi, E. lageniformis, E. scopulicola, E. santaensis and E. puquiensis. All those columnar species thought to be psychoactive have been called "San Pedro" in Spanish. Reported concentrations of mescaline vary widely, with causes suggested to include: taxonomic uncertainty leading to difficulties in identification; genetic differences between species and within populations; environmental factors, such as temperature and water availability, affecting plants during growth; and variations in laboratory techniques.

Some studies have reported no mescaline content in wild-harvested Peruvian specimens of E. peruviana, and in plants grown in Europe. In those studies that have compared different species and cultivars, when mescaline has been found, it has been at very much lower concentrations than in the highest yielding forms of other species; for example 0.24% of dry weight for E. peruviana KK242 compared to 4.7% for a strain of E. pachanoi on sale in traditional Peruvian shamans' markets, a factor of almost 20 times less.

Notes

References

 James D. Mauseth, Roberto Kiesling, Cactus and Succulent Journal (US) 70 (1): 32-39
 Michael S. Smith, The Narcotic and Hallucinogenic Cacti of the New World
 William Rafti, "KK242 Notes and photos" ASIN: B001EHF2BU  Library of Congress Number: 2008902776

External links

peruviana
Cacti of South America
Endemic flora of Peru
Entheogens
Herbal and fungal hallucinogens
Medicinal plants of South America
Psychedelic phenethylamine carriers
Psychoactive cacti